Jana Revedin is a German scholar, researcher, architect and professor thereof.

Born in Konstanz, Germany, Revedin has a degree from the Polytechnic University of Milan and a Doctor of Architecture from Università Iuav di Venezia.  Having previously taught at Iuav, Umeå University, and the Blekinge Institute of Technology, she was a professor at École Spéciale d'Architecture in Paris and a UNESCO delegate.  She founded the Global Award for Sustainable Architecture in 2006, which has been awarded by UNESCO since 2011.

References

21st-century German architects
21st-century German women
academic staff of the Università Iuav di Venezia
academic staff of Umeå University
German scholars
German women academics
living people
people from Konstanz
Polytechnic University of Milan alumni
year of birth missing (living people)